Francesco Fonte (born October 8, 1965 in Rome, Italy) is an Italian former footballer who played as a central midfielder.

Career
Fonte was one of the youth products of Lazio who made his debut during the 1984-85 season. The promise shown by the youngsters was a rare highlight in a dismal relegation season. He moved down to lower league sides Barletta and Monopoli, before brief spells at Bari and Foggia. Fonte enjoyed a longer spell at Avellino, before moving on to Benevento, L'Aquila and finally Battipagliese where he played in Serie C1. Lazio continued to play well in the years after the B series .

External links
Profile at Calcio e Altro

Living people
1965 births
Italian footballers
Footballers from Rome
Serie A players
Serie B players
S.S. Lazio players
S.S.C. Bari players
Calcio Foggia 1920 players
U.S. Avellino 1912 players
Benevento Calcio players
L'Aquila Calcio 1927 players
Association football midfielders